Grzegorz Piwowarski (born 4 December 1971) is a Polish former cyclist. He competed in the team time trial at the 1992 Summer Olympics.

References

External links
 

1971 births
Living people
Polish male cyclists
Olympic cyclists of Poland
Cyclists at the 1992 Summer Olympics
People from Golub-Dobrzyń
Sportspeople from Kuyavian-Pomeranian Voivodeship
20th-century Polish people